The Kolombangara leaf warbler or sombre leaf warbler (Phylloscopus amoenus) is a species of Old World warbler in the family Phylloscopidae.
It is found only in Solomon Islands.
Its natural habitat is subtropical or tropical moist montane forests.
It is threatened by habitat loss.

References

External links

BirdLife Species Factsheet.

Kolombangara leaf warbler
Birds of Kolombangara
Kolombangara leaf warbler
Taxonomy articles created by Polbot